Book Closure date (also known as the record date or ex-dividend date) is the date that a shareholder must hold the stock to receive certain benefits (like share bonus issue, splits and dividend payments).  When shares of a joint stock company invariably change hands during market trades, identifying the owner of some shares becomes difficult. So it is difficult to pass on certain benefits.

So, when a joint stock company declares dividends or bonus issues, there has to be a cut-off date for such benefits to be transferred to the shareholders. This date is termed as "Book Closure" date. It is the date after which the company will not handle any transfer of shares requests until the benefits are transferred. Only shareholders marked in the company's register at the Book Closure Date or the Record Date would be entitled to receive these benefits. In other words, shareholders that are on the company's records as on that date are eligible for these benefits.

If a company announces book closure as 1 January, shareholders who as on that day own the stock will be entitled to the dividend/bonus/split benefit. e.g. If Mr. Y buys this stock from Mr. X on 2 January, the benefit of bonus issue or splits or dividend will still be transferred to Mr. X by the company.

A company generally announces such a date along with the announcement of the bonus issue or splits or dividend announcement, as the case may be.

In an efficient market as per the efficient-market hypothesis (EMH) the effect of the price change due to bonus issue or splits or dividend as on the Book Closure date gets adjusted in the price of the stock in the market effective with the opening of the trade floor on the book closure date.

See also
 Ex-dividend date

Securities (finance)
Dividends